Albara reversaria is a moth of the family Drepanidae. It was described by Francis Walker in 1866. It is found in Sumatra, Borneo, Peninsular Malaysia, the north-eastern parts of the Himalaya and Taiwan.

The larvae feed on Myrica species, as well as the leaves of Quercus variabilis. Mature larvae fix their body to the base of a leaf with silk and curve the leaf margins where pupation takes place.

Subspecies
Albara reversaria reversaria (Sumatra) 
Albara reversaria opalescens (north-eastern Himalaya (Khasis), China (Kwangtung, Linping), Taiwan)

References

External links
The Moths of Borneo

Drepaninae
Moths of Asia